Wolverine Lake is a village in Oakland County in the U.S. state of Michigan. The population was 4,312 at the 2010 census.  The village is located within Commerce Township.

History
Before 1918, Howard Stuart and L. A. Green proposed the idea of damming several small streams in order to create a larger lake.  The project was completed in March 1923, and the growing community was petitioned to be named Wolverine Lake by the end of the year.  The name was chosen after the wolverine, which is the state animal.  Wolverine Lake incorporated as a village in 1954.

Geography

Demographics

2010 census
As of the census of 2010, there were 4,312 people, 1,733 households, and 1,214 families living in the village. The racial makeup of the village was 95.9% White, 0.7% African American, 0.4% Native American, 1.2% Asian, 0.4% from other races, and 1.4% from two or more races. Hispanic or Latino of any race were 2.4% of the population.

There were 1,733 households, of which 31.4% had children under the age of 18 living with them, 55.7% were married couples living together, 9.2% had a female householder with no husband present, 5.1% had a male householder with no wife present, and 29.9% were non-families. 24.1% of all households were made up of individuals, and 5.6% had someone living alone who was 65 years of age or older. The average household size was 2.49 and the average family size was 2.95.

The median age in the village was 42.7 years. 21.6% of residents were under the age of 18; 7.3% were between the ages of 18 and 24; 25.2% were from 25 to 44; 34.3% were from 45 to 64; and 11.6% were 65 years of age or older. The gender makeup of the village was 51.6% male and 48.4% female.

2000 census
As of the census of 2000, there were 4,415 people, 1,671 households, and 1,253 families living in the village. The racial makeup of the village was 97.76% White, 0.41% African American, 0.11% Native American, 0.59% Asian, 0.07% Pacific Islander, 0.25% from other races, and 0.82% from two or more races. Hispanic or Latino of any race were 1.04% of the population.

There were 1,671 households, out of which 35.8% had children under the age of 18 living with them, 63.9% were married couples living together, 7.5% had a female householder with no husband present, and 25.0% were non-families. 20.0% of all households were made up of individuals, and 5.2% had someone living alone who was 65 years of age or older.  The average household size was 2.64 and the average family size was 3.06.

In the village, the population was spread out, with 25.5% under the age of 18, 6.0% from 18 to 24, 33.2% from 25 to 44, 27.8% from 45 to 64, and 7.5% who were 65 years of age or older.  The median age was 38 years. For every 100 females, there were 103.1 males.  For every 100 females age 18 and over, there were 102.2 males.

The median income for a household in the village was $65,682, and the median income for a family was $70,893. Males had a median income of $50,054 versus $32,342 for females. The per capita income for the village was $30,026.  About 2.2% of families and 2.7% of the population were below the poverty line, including 3.0% of those under age 18 and 4.1% of those age 65 or over.

Education
It is within the Walled Lake Consolidated Schools. Guest Elementary School and Loon Lake Elementary School serve portions of Wolverine Lake. Portions are zoned to James R. Geisler Middle School, and portions are zoned to Sarah Banks Middle School. All of Wolverine Lake is zoned to Walled Lake Central High School.

References

External links
Official website of the village of Wolverine Lake

Villages in Oakland County, Michigan
Villages in Michigan
Metro Detroit
Populated places established in 1954
1954 establishments in Michigan